City Seminary of Sacramento is a conservative, evangelical seminary in Sacramento, California.

History
Established in 2000, it offers a seminary education to students from a variety of denominational backgrounds. It is dedicated to the philosophy that "no student called to the preaching ministry should be denied an education for financial reasons." Since its founding, the seminary has raised private funding to supply all scholarship requests, and as a matter of policy, forbids students to go into debt to pay for tuition.

In 2021, the Board of Governors approved the launch of the Seminario Reformado de las Américas, based in Quito, Ecuador, offering a similar tuition debt-free program for Spanish-speaking students in North and Siuth America. All faculty are drawn from the Reformed Church in the United States, United Reformed Churches in North America, Presbyterian Church of America, and Reformed Presbyterian Church of North America. The City Seminary student body is drawn largely from among the Sacramento area's minority communities and caters especially to older working students with families that cannot afford to leave their employment and travel to a distant seminary, while the Quito campus offers both regional in-person classes and distance learning.

City Seminary grants undergraduate divinity, as well as Master of Divinity degrees. This does not mean the state 'accredits' the seminary's degree programs, nor has the seminary sought secular accreditation. The curriculum is a classical Reformed studies program that emphasizes proficiency in Greek and Hebrew, with a strong emphasis on presuppositional apologetics and biblical inerrancy. Either men or women may enroll in most classes and programs, but the Bachelor of Divinity and Master of Divinity degree are awarded only to men for theological reasons.

References

External links
 
 Leben. Quarterly history magazine of City Seminary

Seminaries and theological colleges in California
Universities and colleges in Sacramento County, California
Reformed church seminaries and theological colleges
Educational institutions established in 2000
2000 establishments in California